Nirguna Dam is an earthfill dam on Nirguna River near Patur, Akola district, in the state of Maharashtra in India.

Specifications

Purpose
 Irrigation

See also
 Dams in Maharashtra
 List of reservoirs and dams in India

References

Dams in Akola district
Dams completed in 1975
1975 establishments in Maharashtra